Marolterode is a municipality in the Unstrut-Hainich-Kreis district of Thuringia, Germany. Located just east of another small town, Schlotheim, it is placed in between Bundesstraßen (federal roads) 249 and 84.

References

Unstrut-Hainich-Kreis